"Sir Watkyn Bassett's Memoirs" is the fifth episode of the third series of the 1990s British comedy television series Jeeves and Wooster. It is also called "Hot off the Press".

In the US, it was aired as the third episode of the second series of Jeeves and Wooster on Masterpiece Theatre, on 10 January 1993.

Background 
Adapted from "Jeeves Takes Charge" (collected in Carry On, Jeeves) and The Mating Season.

Cast
 Bertie Wooster – Hugh Laurie
 Jeeves – Stephen Fry
 Roderick Spode – John Turner
 Sir Watkyn Bassett – John Woodnutt
 Gussie Fink-Nottle – Richard Braine
 Florence Craye – Fiona Gillies
 Madeline Bassett – Elizabeth Morton
 Stiffy Byng – Amanda Harris
 Stinker – Simon Treves
 Constable Oates – Stewart Harwood
 Receptionist – Lucy Parker
 Butterfield – David Rolfe
 Mrs Blackett – Diana Cummings

Plot 

Sir Watkyn Bassett is writing his memoirs of his misspent youth, which also include a lot of other misspent youths of people who are now famous. Bertie, who has just become engaged, is sent to destroy the manuscript. Guests at the house include would-be dictator Roderick Spode, Gussie Fink-Nottle and, nearby, another old enemy of Bertie's, Constable Oates. The local vicar is Stinker Pinker. Added to this is a number of tough young ladies, a local play and a dog that gets arrested, all of which means a lively time for Bertie and Jeeves.

See also
 List of Jeeves and Wooster characters

References

External links
 

1992 British television episodes
Jeeves and Wooster episodes